Phalonidia parvana is a species of moth of the family Tortricidae. It is found in Japan on the island of Honshu.

References

Moths described in 1980
Phalonidia